Polkey v AE Dayton Services Ltd [1987] UKHL 8 is a UK labour law case, concerning unfair dismissal, now governed by the Employment Rights Act 1996.

The phrase 'Polkey deduction' has become a standard concept in UK Employment Tribunals, as a result of this case and later ones, meaning that even if a Tribunal decides a dismissal was unfair, it must separately decide whether the compensatory award is to be awarded in full, or be reduced by a percentage based on their estimate of the probability that the dismissal would have occurred anyway, even had a fair process been followed.

Facts
Mr Polkey drove a van for 4 years until he was told to come to his manager’s office and informed that he was being made redundant on the spot.

The Tribunal said this was "heartless disregard of the provisions of the code of practice" but recognized that redundancies were necessary.

Judgment
Lord Bridge held that on the proper construction of the fairness test in the predecessor to the Employment Rights Act 1996 section 98, it was irrelevant to ask whether a different outcome may have resulted from a proper procedure, and it was not open for a tribunal to ask that. An employer does not act unreasonably if (1) employees who underperform are warned and given an opportunity to improve (2) employees who engage in misconduct are investigated and given a hearing (3) employees who are redundant are given good warning and a consultation with steps to minimise losses. But if the end result would be the same, then this will go to remedy not liability:

History
After the development of a requirement for procedural fairness in dismissal was introduced by Polkey, an attempt was made in 2002 to amend the Employment Rights Act 1996 to add a statutory basis for procedural fairness. In 2008, the government repealed this attempt at statutory codification and reverted to relying on the case law developed in Polkey.

See also

UK labour law

References

External links
Polkey Deduction: important 2013 case: Contract Bottling v Cave Bailii.org

United Kingdom labour case law
House of Lords cases
1987 in case law
1987 in British law